Terje Wesche (born May 15, 1947) is a Norwegian sprint canoer who competed in the early 1970s. At the 1972 Summer Olympics in Munich, he was disqualified in the heats of the K-2 1000 m event due to management fault. He won several gold medals i international competitions and in the Norwegian and Nordic Championships.

References
Sports-reference.com profile

1947 births
Canoeists at the 1972 Summer Olympics
Living people
Norwegian male canoeists
Olympic canoeists of Norway
Place of birth missing (living people)